Lonnie Plaxico (born September 4, 1960) is an American jazz double bassist.

Biography
Plaxico was born in Chicago, Illinois, into a musical family, and started playing the bass at the age of twelve, turning professional at fourteen (playing both double bass and bass guitar). His first recording was with his family's band, and by the time he was twenty he had moved to New York City, where he had stints playing with Chet Baker, Dexter Gordon, Sonny Stitt, Junior Cook, and Hank Jones. He won the Louis Armstrong Jazz Award in 1978.

Plaxico first came to public attention through his work with the Wynton Marsalis group in 1982, though his first regular attachment was with Art Blakey's Jazz Messengers (1983–86), with whom he recorded twelve albums.

In the mid-1980s Plaxico joined the M-Base collective and played on the debut-releases of Steve Coleman (Motherland Pulse, 1985), Cassandra Wilson (Point of View, 1986) and Greg Osby (Sound Theatre, 1987). On Wilson's recordings he appeared regularly ever since and is the musical director and first bassist of her tour band for more than 15 years.
 
In 1986 Jack DeJohnette reformed his Special Edition and engaged beside guitarist Mick Goodrick the M-Base saxophonists Greg Osby and Gary Thomas and Plaxico on bass. The band existed until 1993, after three albums with pianist Michael Cain replacing Goodrick on the last.

Plaxico has also performed and recorded with a wide range of artists, including Dizzy Gillespie, David Murray, Alice Coltrane, Stanley Turrentine, Andrew Hill, Joe Sample, Abbey Lincoln, Bill Cosby, Lonnie Liston Smith, Ravi Coltrane, Scott Tixier, Barbara Dennerlein, Helen Sung and Nina Vidal.

Discography

As leader
 1989: Plaxico (Muse)
 1990: Iridescence (Muse)
 1992: Short Takes (Muse)
 1993: With All Your Heart (Muse)
 2000: Emergence (Savant)
 2001: Mélange (Blue Note)
 2002: Live at the 5:01 Jazz Bar (Orchard, Plaxmusic)
 2003: Rhythm and Soul (Sirocco Jazz)
 2004: Live at Jazz Standard (Village, Japan)
 2006: So Alive (Eighty-Eight's)
 2006: West Side Stories (Plaxmusic)
 2007: Live at the Zinc Bar NYC (Plaxmusic)
 2009: Ancestral Devotion (Plaxmusic)

As sideman
With Art Blakey and the Jazz Messengers
 Aurex Jazz Festival (Eastworld, 1983)
 New York Scene (Concord, 1984)
 Blue Night (Timeless, 1985)
 Live at Sweet Basil (Paddle Wheel, 1985)
 Live at Kimball's (Concord, 1985)
 Live at Ronnie Scott's (Wadham, 1985)
 Hard Champion (Paddle Wheel, 1985)
 Farewell (Paddle Wheel, 1985)
 New Year's Eve at Sweet Basil (King/ProJazz, 1985)
 Dr. Jeckyle - Live at Sweet Basil Vol. 2 (ProJazz, 1985)
With Cindy Blackman
Code Red (Muse, 1990 [1992])
With Cecil Brooks III
The Collective (Muse, 1989)
 Smokin' Jazz (Muse, 1996)
With Steve Coleman
 Motherland Pulse (JMT, 1985)
 Five Elements, Sine Die (Pangaea, 1988)
With Ravi Coltrane
Moving Pictures (RCA/BMG, 1998)
With Robin Eubanks
 Karma (JMT, 1991)
With Dizzy Gillespie
 New Faces (GRP, 1985)
With Bunky Green
 Another Place (Label Bleu, 2004 [2006])
With Cassandra Wilson
 Point of View (JMT, 1986)
 Blue Skies (JMT, 1988)
 Jumpworld (JMT, 1990)
 Blue Light 'til Dawn (Blue Note, 1993)
 New Moon Daughter (Blue Note, 1995)
 Rendezvous (Blue Note, 1997), with Jacky Terrasson
 Traveling Miles (Blue Note, 1999)
 Loverly (Blue Note, 2008)
 Coming Forth by Day (Legacy, 2015)
 5 Original Albums (Blute Note, 2018)

With Greg Osby
 Greg Osby and Sound Theatre (JMT, 1987)
 Mindgames (JMT, 1988)
 Season of Renewal (JMT, 1990)
 Zero (Blue Note, 1998)

With Jack DeJohnette's Special Edition
 Irresistible Forces (Impulse!/MCA, 1987)
 Audio-Visualscapes (Impulse!/MCA, 1988)
 Earthwalk (Blue Note, 1991)

With Ron Jackson
 A Guitar Thing You (Muse, 1991)
 Thinking of You (Muse, 1993)

With Don Byron
 Tuskegee Experiments (Nonesuch, 1992)
 Ivey-Divey (Blue Note, 2004)

With Bud Shank
 I Told You So (Candid, 1992)

With Carola Grey
 Noisy Mama (Jazzline, 1992)

With Lafayette Harris
 Lafayette Is Here (Muse, 1993)

With Hannibal Marvin Peterson
 One with the Wind (Muse, 1993)

With Gust Tsilis
 Wood Music (Enja, 1993)

With Regina Carter
 Regina Carter (Atlantic, 1995)

With Talib Kibwe
 Introducing Talib Kibwe (Evidence, 1996)

With Barbara Dennerlein
 Take Off! (Verve, 1995)

With Jean-Paul Bourelly, Harry Sokal, and Ronnie Burrage
 Mag Five (PAO, 1998)

With LaMont Johnson
 241 East 3rd St. (Orchard, 1998)

With Ray Anderson
 Lapis Lazuli Band, Funkorific (Enja, 1998)

With Mark Ledford
 Miles to Go (Verve Forecast, 1998)

With Ravi Coltrane
 Moving Pictures (RCA, 1998)
With Jason Moran
Soundtrack to Human Motion (Blue Note, 1999)
With Teri Thornton
 I'll Be Easy to Find (Verve, 1999)

With Bunky Green
 Another Place (Label Bleu, 2006)

With Brian Landrus
 Traverse (BlueLand, 2012)

With Yukiko Onishi aka Yucco Miller
 Yucco Miller (King, 2016)

References

External links 
Carr, Ian, Digby Fairweather, & Brian Priestley. Jazz: The Rough Guide. London: Rough Guides. 
Plaxico's Web site
[ Lonnie Plaxico] on Allmusic
Brief bio by Chris Parker for the Ronnie Scott's Jazz Club pages
Interview with Plaxico for 441 Records

1960 births
Living people
African-American guitarists
American jazz double-bassists
Male double-bassists
American jazz bass guitarists
American male bass guitarists
The Jazz Messengers members
Muse Records artists
Blue Note Records artists
Guitarists from Chicago
Jazz musicians from Illinois
21st-century double-bassists
American male jazz musicians